Voru may refer to:

Places
 Võru County, Estonia
 Võru, a town and municipality, capital of the county
 Võru Parish, a rural municipality in the county
 Voru, Razavi Khorasan, Iran, a village
 Voru, Tajikistan, a village and jamoat

Other uses
 Võru JK, a former football club based in Võru, Estonia
 Võru railway station, Võru, Estonia

See also
Voro (disambiguation)